The third HMS Penzance (L28) was a  sloop launched in 1930, and torpedoed and sunk in 1940 whilst on convoy protection duty by the  with the loss of 90 of her 104 crew. She was named after the Cornish port of Penzance and was the third Royal Navy ship to bear that name.

Construction and design
Penzance was one of two Hastings-class sloops ordered on 4 April 1928, following on from two ordered earlier in the year, as part of the 1928 construction programme.

Displacement was  standard and  full load. The ship was powered by two Parsons geared steam turbines, each driving one propeller shaft, using steam provided by two Admiralty three-drum boiler.

The main armament consisted of a pair of QF four-inch (102 mm) Mk V guns on the ship's centreline, one forward and one aft, with the forward gun on a high-angle mount, capable of anti-aircraft fire and the second gun on a low-angle mount, for anti-surface use only. The aft 4 inch gun was replaced by a similar gun in a high angle mounting in 1939. Two  3-pounder  saluting guns were also carried, while the anti-submarine armament initially consisted of four depth charges. Following the outbreak of war, the ships depth charge outfit was increased to 40.

Penzance was laid down at Devonport dockyard on 29 July 1929, was launched on 10 April 1930 and completed on 15 January 1931.

Service

Pre-war service
After commissioning, Penzance was deployed to the Persian Gulf, serving there until October 1931, when she moved to the Red Sea. She was refitted at Malta in May 1932, returning to the Red Sea. She was refitted again and recommissioned at Malta in June 1933. In May 1934 Penzance evacuated 300 British and Indian civilians from the Yemeni city of Al Hudaydah to Kamaran Island because of fighting between Saudi and Yemeni forces. When sister ship  ran aground on 11 June 1934, Penzance was employed in the salvage operations, ferrying personnel and equipment to and from the stranded vessel until Hastings was finally refloated on 6 September that year.

Penzance was refitted at Simonstown, South Africa from August 1936 to January 1937 and then joined the Africa Station, based in South Africa. She returned to Britain in May 1938 and after refit at Chatham Dockyard, joined the America and West Indies Station, arriving at Bermuda in June 1939.

Second World War
On the outbreak of the Second World War in September 1939, Penzance was initially employed on patrol duties, checking for contraband and watching German merchant ships in neutral ports in the region. From March 1940 she escorted convoys running between Bermuda and Halifax, Nova Scotia.

In July 1940 Penzance was ordered home and on 15 August 1940 left Sydney, Nova Scotia as the only armed escort of Convoy SC 1. By 24 August Penzance was 700 miles south–west of Iceland when she was torpedoed by the German submarine . She was hit by a torpedo on the starboard side, split in two, with some of her depth charges exploding, and sank quickly. Losses were heavy, with 89 of her crew killed, and one more later dying of wounds.

References

Bibliography

External links
  HMS Penzance memorial unveiled
 HMS Penzance at uboats.net

 

Hastings-class sloops
World War II sloops of the United Kingdom
1930 ships
Ships built in Plymouth, Devon
Ships sunk by German submarines in World War II
Maritime incidents in August 1940